Saplı Islet (meaning "Island with a handle", also called Boynuince Islet) is a Mediterranean tombolo of Turkey.
At  it forms the west wall of the bay named Soğuksu. Its distance to Mersin is about 

It is connected to the main land by a short path. There are ruins of the antiquity on the islet. Although currently there is no archaeological excavation on the islet, it is included in SİT areas in Turkey.

References

Mediterranean islands
Islands of Turkey
Islands of Mersin Province
Aydıncık District (Mersin)